Longuenoë is a former commune in the Orne department in north-western France. On 1 January 2019, it was merged into the new commune L'Orée-d'Écouves.

Commune borders 

The commune is surrounded by:

 Saint-Didier-sous-Écouves to the north
 Livaie to the west
 La Roche-Mabile to the south
 Saint-Ellier-les-Bois to the east.

Demographics 

The population has varied over the past 200 years:

See also 

 Communes of the Orne department
 Parc naturel régional Normandie-Maine

References 

Former communes of Orne